Waitstill R. Ranney (May 23, 1791  August 23, 1853) was a Vermont doctor and politician who served as 13th lieutenant governor of Vermont from 1841 to 1843.

Biography
Waitstill Randolph Ranney was born in Chester, Vermont on May 23, 1791.  He studied at Dartmouth and Middlebury Colleges and became a physician while also maintaining a farm in Townshend.  In 1827 Ranney received an honorary degree from Castleton Medical College.

Ranney served in several local offices, including school board member.  He was a Delegate to the 1828 Vermont constitutional convention and a member of the Vermont House of Representatives from 1834 to 1836.

He became active in the Whig Party at its founding, served in the Vermont Senate from 1836 to 1838.  He transferred his farm to one of his sons in the late 1830s and moved to a home in the center of town.

Ranney presided over the famous July, 1840 Whig political meeting on Stratton Mountain at which Daniel Webster spoke ("Fellow citizens, I have come to meet you among the clouds...").

He served as Lieutenant Governor from 1841 to 1843.

Ranney remained active until his health began to fail in the late 1840s, after which he lived in retirement in Townshend.  He died in Townshend on August 23, 1853 and was buried in Townshend's Oakwood Cemetery.

Family
Among Ranney's children was Ambrose Arnold Ranney, who served in the United States House of Representatives from Massachusetts.

References

External links

Waitstill R. Ranney at The Political Graveyard

1791 births
1853 deaths
People from Chester, Vermont
Vermont Whigs
19th-century American politicians
Lieutenant Governors of Vermont
Vermont state senators
Members of the Vermont House of Representatives
People from Windham County, Vermont
Dartmouth College alumni
Middlebury College alumni
Burials in Vermont